Tan Thol (born 2 April 1941) is a former Cambodian cyclist. He competed in the 1000m time trial and men's sprint events at the 1964 Summer Olympics.

References

External links
 

1943 births
Living people
Cambodian male cyclists
Cyclists at the 1964 Summer Olympics
Place of birth missing (living people)
Olympic cyclists of Cambodia